Piz Cotschen is a mountain of the Swiss Silvretta Alps, located north of Guarda and Ardez in the canton of Graubünden. It lies between the valleys of Val Tuoi and Val Tasna.

References

External links
 Piz Cotschen on Hikr

Mountains of Switzerland
Mountains of Graubünden
Mountains of the Alps
Alpine three-thousanders
Scuol